Chan-Hae Lee (born 8 October 1945) is a South Korean music educator and composer.

Life
Chan-Hae Lee was born in Seoul, Korea, and studied composition at Yonsei University in Seoul with Jae-Yul Park and Un-Young La. She continued her studies with George T. Jones and Conrad Bernier at Catholic University in Washington, D.C., graduating with a MA and PhD. Later she attended seminars and festivals, studying the Kodály method in Hungary in 1989, and was a visiting scholar at Oakland University and the Paris Conservatory.

After completing her education, she took a position in 1977 as professor of composition at Yonsei University. She has also served as visiting professor at Wayne State University. Lee has received The National Composition Prize of Korea and her works have been performed internationally.

Works
Selected works include:
With for trombone and string quartet
Back to the Origins, opera
The Rabbit Story

References

1945 births
Living people
20th-century classical composers
South Korean music educators
People from Seoul
South Korean classical composers
South Korean expatriates in France
South Korean expatriates in Hungary
South Korean expatriates in the United States
Catholic University of America alumni
Women classical composers
Yonsei University alumni
Women music educators
20th-century women composers